PBSA may refer to:

Pakistan Boy Scouts Association
Papers of the Bibliographical Society of America
PBS America